Pivorai − village in the southeast part of Ignalina district in Lithuania. According to the 2011 census, it had 30 residents. It is located 1,8 kilometres south of Galalaukiai. The village has a cemetery. In the village buried Lithuanian folk songs singer Kristina Skrebutėnienė.

Nature and Geography 
Through village flowing Birvėta river. Many plains. Near was a Adutiškis forest.

References

External links 
 Pivorai weather

Ignalina District Municipality
Villages in Utena County